Sir Henry Floyd Grammar School (SHFGS) is an 11–18 mixed, grammar school and sixth form with academy status in Aylesbury, Buckinghamshire, England. It is named after Sir Henry Floyd, a former Lord Lieutenant of Buckinghamshire. As a selective school, its entry requirements are governed by the exam taken by students entering Year 7.

History 
The school was founded as the Aylesbury Technical College in 1948. The original school was built in Walton Road Aylesbury and remained there until the early 1960s. The School had been a 'selective' school for many years requiring a 'pass' in the Eleven Plus examination to attain entry. When it moved to its current site on Oxford Road in 1963, the name was changed to Aylesbury Technical High School. In 1965, the school was renamed as The Sir Henry Floyd Grammar School, after Sir Henry Floyd, the Lord Lieutenant of Buckinghamshire at the time.

Houses 
The school has a house system of six houses, which are named after estates in the local area and represented by a colour. Students are allocated to a house. The houses are:

 Ascott – Yellow
 Claydon – Purple
 Hartwell – Red
 Mentmore – Green
 Stowe – Aqua
 Waddesdon – Blue

Facilities 
The school has a performing arts building, complete with theatre, music practice rooms and a recording studio. It also has a library, computer rooms, two of which are specialised for technology and performing arts departments, laptops for departmental use, and two further suites of computers specifically for sixth form students. The whole school site has WiFi access.

In addition, it has a large sports field which is used for football, rugby, hockey, cricket and athletics plus five tennis courts which are also used for netball. A new sports hall was given planning permission in 2006 which was completed in 2014.

References

External links 
 

Aylesbury
Grammar schools in Buckinghamshire
Academies in Buckinghamshire
International Baccalaureate schools in England
Educational institutions established in 1947
1947 establishments in England